The men's 182 + 364 + 546 + 728 medley relay event at the 1968 European Indoor Games was held on 10 March in Madrid. The first athlete ran one lap of the 182-metre track, the second two, the third three and the anchor four, thus 10 laps or 1820 metres in total.

Results

References

4 × 400 metres relay at the European Athletics Indoor Championships
Relay